Project Moonman is an experimental Filipino rock band formed in Manila, Philippines, in 2020 during the COVID-19 pandemic. The band is composed of producer, songwriter and vocalist Mark Thompson, songwriter and vocalist Owen Greyson, lead guitarist Nick Gotinga, bass guitarist Alden Acosta, and drummer Lukas Samuel. Later in 2021, they added DJ Arden Formento in the band. The band is signed with O/C Records, releasing their debut studio album Gemini in 2021

The sound of Project Moonman is defined as a mix of raw vocals, personal expression, cinematic textures, live instrumentals and electronic music.

History

Early years
Mark Thompson had songs for a band he wants to form, he got signed to O/C Records and had to find band members. Coming from the DJ scene, he wanted to create something different, to perform with musicians instead of doing it alone.

He met Nick Gotinga (lead guitarist) and Alden Acosta (bass guitarist) through Kean Cipriano during a recording session at O/C Records. That same day Mark met Martin Riggs Nuñez. They were there to just hang out and talk about the plans for Project Moonman.

Alden & Mark hit it off because they were talking about the technical side of mixing and mastering. Where as Nick played every riff on the first listen in the O/C Records recording studio which blew Mark's blew my mind.

Owen Greyson & Mark have been working together already, Mark has been producing some of Owen's songs. And got him on board to fill the backing vocals for our live. Eventually he also wrote some verses and joined the group.

Lukas Samuel (drums) and Mark met through Nick. Nick and Lukas were former band Mates. They needed a drummer for their first round of live performances (online). Lukas fits the role perfectly.

Arden Formento (DJ) came in late, he's been in Battle Circuit DJing. Mark relates to that, because it's the same route he went through. Arden's role is to fill all the electronic sounds and vocal samples in the original songs and provide space.

Debut album: Gemini
The band released their debut album in June 2021 being titled Gemini.

Band members
Mark Thompson – producer, songwriter, vocalist
Owen Greyson – songwriter, vocalist
Nick Gotinga – lead guitarist
Alden Acosta – bass guitarist
Lukas Samuel – drums
Arden Formento – dj

Discography

Studio albums
 Gemini (2021)

Singles

As a featured artist

References

External links

Filipino rock music groups
Filipino pop music groups
Musical groups from Metro Manila
Musical groups established in 2020
2020 establishments in the Philippines